Bruno Nicolás Toledo Dante (born 25 August 1994) is a Uruguayan footballer who plays for Luftëtari Gjirokastër in the Albanian Superliga.

References

1994 births
Living people
Uruguayan footballers
Uruguayan expatriate footballers
Expatriate footballers in Albania
Luftëtari Gjirokastër players
Kategoria Superiore players
Association football defenders
Uruguayan expatriate sportspeople in Albania